Ted Johnson (born 25 January 1948) is a former  Australian rules footballer who played with Hawthorn in the Victorian Football League (VFL).

Notes

External links 

Living people
1948 births
Australian rules footballers from Victoria (Australia)
Hawthorn Football Club players